Pasdar may refer to:
 Adrian Pasdar, an Iranian-American actor
 A title for members of the Islamic Revolutionary Guard Corps (nicknamed the "Pasdaran")